Baboon is an American rock band originally from Denton, Texas.

The band formed in 1991. Their latest studio album, titled Baboon, was released on October 10, 2006.

Baboon appeared on an episode of Walker, Texas Ranger titled "Hall of Fame" in 1996. The band and their music were a key point in the episode's plot.

In its early years, Baboon, Brutal Juice, and Caulk were known collectively in the Denton area as the "Fraternity of Noise." Baboon toured extensively, including a stint on the Skoal-sponsored R.O.A.R. Tour in 1997, along with acts such as Iggy Pop, The Reverend Horton Heat, The Bloodhound Gang, and Sponge. They also toured with Toadies, Brutal Juice, and Unwound.

Vocalist Andrew Huffstetler and guitarist Mike Rudnicki formed The Boom Boom Box in 2008 and released a self-titled EP later than year, and a full-length album, titled Until Your Eyes Get Used To The Darkness, through Kirtland Records in 2012.

Band members

Current members
Andrew Huffstetler - vocals, trombone
Mike Rudnicki - guitar
James Henderson - guitar (2003–present)
Bart Rogers - bass (1991–1994, 2010–present)
Steven Barnett - drums (1992–present)

Former members
Bryan Schmitz - bass (1994–1995)
Will Johnson - drums (1991–1992)
Mark Reznicek - percussion, keyboard (2002)
Mark Hughes - bass (1995–2008)

Former unofficial members
Ben Burt - drums
Matt Pence - drums

Discography

Albums

 Face Down in Turpentine (1994)
 secret robot control (1997)
 A Bum Note and a Bead of Sweat (2001)
 Something Good Is Going to Happen to You (2002)
 Baboon (2006)

Singles / E.P.s / Demos

 ed Lobster (1991)
 Sausage (1992)
 Save Me (1993)
 Tool (1993)
 The Numb E.P. (1996)
 Halloween Sound FX (1996)
 The Kissing Song / King of the Damned Laser Gag! (1997)
 Free Sampler (1997)
 We Sing and Play (1999)

Compilations

See also
List of alternative music artists

External links

The Original Baboon Site

Musical groups established in 1991
Alternative rock groups from Texas
Musical groups from Denton, Texas
1991 establishments in Texas
Wind-up Records artists